The 1856 Dallas mayoral election was the first mayoral election in Dallas, Texas. The election was held on April 5, 1856. In the election, Dr. Samuel B. Pryor defeated challenger and eventual mayor A. D. Rice.

References

Mayoral elections in Dallas
Non-partisan elections